Tropidophorus iniquus  is a species of skink found in Indonesia.

References

iniquus
Reptiles of Indonesia
Reptiles described in 1905
Taxa named by Theodorus Willem van Lidth de Jeude